Katya Ilieva (born 3 January 1963) is a retired Bulgarian sprinter who specialized in the 400 metres.

She finished eighth in the 4 × 400 metres relay at the 1983 World Championships, with teammates Svobodka Damyanova, Rositsa Stamenova and Galina Penkova.

Her personal best time was 51.11 seconds, achieved in August 1987 in Sofia.

References

1963 births
Living people
Bulgarian female sprinters
21st-century Bulgarian women
20th-century Bulgarian women